George Wilder Mitchell (February 23, 1904 – January 25, 1997) was an American economist who served as the 9th vice chairman of the Federal Reserve from 1973 to 1976. Prior to his term as vice chairman, Mitchell served as a member of the Federal Reserve Board of Governors, taking office in 1961. He was a long-time staffer at the Federal Reserve Bank of Chicago before his appointment to the Board. Mitchell was an early promoter of electronic banking.

Early life and education
Mitchell was born on February 23, 1904, to George Ray and Minnie Mitchell in rural Richland Center, WI. He graduated from the University of Wisconsin in 1925.  After graduating, he worked as a research assistant at the University of Iowa and the University of Chicago until 1932.

Career
In 1933, Mitchell was hired as the Director of Research for the Illinois Tax Commission. In 1940, he became Assistant to the Director of Revenue for the State of Illinois.

In 1943, Mitchell joined the staff of the Federal Reserve Bank of Chicago, but was also as a consultant for the Bureau of Internal Revenue. During this time, Mitchell simultaneously served as Director of Finance for the State of Illinois under Governor Adlai Stevenson.  He was later appointed as the head of research for the Chicago Fed.

In 1961, President John F. Kennedy appointed Mitchell as a Governor for the Federal Reserve Board.

In 1973, President Richard Nixon appointed Mitchell as the Vice Chair of the Federal Reserve.  He served under Fed Chairman Arthur F. Burns.  Shortly thereafter, he was thrust into a difficult position of resisting a guarantee of the municipal bonds of New York City, echoing the stance favored by President Gerald Ford.  Mitchell stated that a guarantee would be akin to a bailout and would subject the Fed to all manner of political pressures.  Ultimately, the federal government helped New York City avoid bankruptcy with a loan and debt restructuring by the Municipal Assistance Corporation in 1975.

Mitchell was a member of the American Economic Association, American Finance Association, and National Committee on Government Finance, Brookings Institution.

References

External links
Statements and Speeches of George Wilder Mitchell

1904 births
1997 deaths
Ford administration personnel
Lyndon B. Johnson administration personnel
Kennedy administration personnel
Nixon administration personnel
People from Richland Center, Wisconsin
University of Chicago alumni
Vice Chairs of the Federal Reserve